A flotilla leader was a warship of late 19th century and early 20th century navies suitable for commanding a flotilla of destroyers or other small warships, typically a small cruiser or a large destroyer (known as a destroyer leader). The flotilla leader provided space, equipment and staff for the flotilla commodore (who typically held the rank of captain), including a wireless room, senior engineering and gunnery officers, and administrative staff to support the officers. Originally, older light or scout cruisers were often used, but in the early 1900s, the rapidly increasing speed of new destroyer designs meant that such vessels could no longer keep pace with their charges. Accordingly, large destroyer designs were produced for use as leaders.

As destroyers changed from specialized anti-torpedo boat vessels that operated in squadrons to larger multi-purpose ships that operated alone or as leaders of groups of smaller vessels, and as command and control techniques improved (and the technology became more readily available), the need for specialized flotilla leaders decreased and their functions were adopted by all destroyers. The last specialized flotilla leader to be built for the Royal Navy was HMS Inglefield, launched in 1936. Subsequent leaders used the same design as the private ships of the class, with minor detailed changes to suit them to their role. In the Royal Navy, the flotilla leader and commanding officer were known as Captain (D). In the Royal Navy, flotilla leaders and divisional leaders could be identified by particular coloured bands painted on their funnels.

Flotilla leader designs

French Navy
 Jaguar-class flotilla leader
 Guépard-class flotilla leader
 Aigle-class flotilla leader
 Le Fantasque-class flotilla leader

German Navy
 Type 1936A-class destroyer

Imperial Japanese Navy
 Tenryū-class light cruiser
 Kuma-class light cruiser
 Nagara-class light cruiser
 Sendai-class light cruiser
 Agano-class light cruiser

Royal Navy 
 Swift – prototype (1907)
 Faulknor-class leader (1915)
 Marksman-class leader (1915)
 Parker-class leader (1916)
 Admiralty V-class leader
 Admiralty type leader (1918)
 Thornycroft type leader (1920)
 The leader of each of the "interwar standard" A- through I-classes was built to a slightly enlarged design:
 Codrington (1930)
 Keith (1931)
 Kempenfelt (1932)
 Duncan (1933)
 Exmouth (1934)
 Faulknor (1935)
 Grenville (1936)
 Hardy (1936)
 Inglefield (1937)

Royal Italian Navy 
 Capitani Romani-class flotilla leader

Royal Netherlands Navy 
 Tromp-class flotilla leader (Sometimes classed as a light cruiser)

Royal Romanian Navy 
 Mărăști-class flotilla leader

Royal Yugoslav Navy 
 Destroyer Dubrovnik (1931)
 Destroyer Split

Soviet Navy 
 Leningrad-class destroyer
 Tashkent-class destroyer

United States Navy

Porter-class destroyers
Somers-class destroyers
Atlanta-class light cruisers (were originally designed as flotilla leaders, though soon retasked as anti-aircraft cruisers)
 See the List of United States Navy destroyer leaders for post-World War II ships

See also
 Destroyer leader
 Esploratori
 Scout cruiser
List of destroyers of the Second World War

Notes

References

External links 

Ship types
Destroyers of the United States Navy